The 1937 Cork Senior Hurling Championship was the 49th staging of the Cork Senior Hurling Championship since its establishment by the Cork County Board in 1887. The championship ended on 21 November 1937.

Glen Rovers were the defending champions.

On 21 November 1937, Glen Rovers won the championship following a 3-5 to 1-0 defeat of Carrigtwohill in the final. This was their fourth championship title and the fourth of eight successive championships.

Team changes

To Championship

Promoted from the Cork Intermediate Hurling Championship
 St. Anne's

Results

First round

Second round

Semi-finals

Final

Championship statistics

Miscellaneous

After being defeated by Sarsfields in the semi-final, Carrigtwohill launched an objection over the eligibility of Sarsfields player John Ryan. The appeal was thrown out by the Cork County Board, however, it was later upheld after a further appeal to the Munster council and a replay was ordered a full two months after the initial disputed match. By this stage the posters advertising the county final between Glen Rovers and Sarsfields were already on display.

Five time winners Redmonds opening round loss to Muskerry was the clubs last game in the senior championship.

References

Cork Senior Hurling Championship
Cork Senior Hurling Championship